South Shore Brewery is a regional craft brewery in Ashland, Wisconsin, USA. It was founded in 1995 and owned by brewmaster Bo Bélanger. The brewery was the seventh licensed microbrewery in the state of Wisconsin, and became northern Wisconsin's first modern micro-brewery. South Shore produces an assortment of beers, many of which are seasonal. 

The brewery is located inside of a local brewpub, the Deepwater Grille, where all of the brewery's beverages are available on tap. In addition to the main brewery in Ashland, a second location was opened in Washburn in 2016, that serves as an additional production facility, tasting room, and retail outlet.

As of 2016, South Shore beer is available for sale in 60 counties, in three states.

Products
The company's flagship beer is Nut Brown Ale, a medium-colored ale, with low bitterness.

In 2008, the brewery gained notability within the Local Food Movement when it began using locally produced barley, and regional hops.

Year-round beers
Nut Brown Ale
Inland Sea Pilsener
Rhoades' Scholar Stout
Northern Lights Cream Ale
Red Lager
American Pale Ale

Seasonal beers
AppleFest Ale
Bavarian Wheat
Maple Amber
Coffee Mint Stout
Bourbon Barrel Coffee Mint Stout
Honey Double Maibock

See also

Ashland Brewing Company, also of Ashland, WI
List of breweries in Wisconsin
Beer in the United States

References

External links 
 South Shore Brewery Facebook page
 South Shore Brewery website

Beer brewing companies based in Wisconsin
Food and drink companies established in 1995
1995 establishments in Wisconsin